Holding On may refer to:

Film and television 
 Holding On (TV series), a British television drama
 "Holding On" (House), the 21st episode of the eighth season of medical drama House, M.D.

Literature 
 Holding On, a book by Mervyn Jones

Songs 
 "Holding On" (Beverley Craven song)
 "Holding On" (Dannii Minogue song)
 "Holding On" (Disclosure song)
 "Holding On" (Steve Winwood song)
 "Holding On (When Love Is Gone)", by L.T.D.
 "Holdin On", by Flume
 "Holding On", by DragonForce from The Power Within
 "Holding On", by FireHouse from Prime Time
 "Holding On", by Iann Dior
 "Holding On", by Infernal
 "Holding On", by Jay Sean from Me Against Myself
 "Holding On", by Simple Plan from Simple Plan
 "Holding On", by The War on Drugs from A Deeper Understanding
 "Holdin' On", by Jessi Colter from Ridin' Shotgun

See also 
 Hold On (disambiguation)